State Road 162 in the U.S. state of Indiana is a  route in Dubois and Spencer counties. Though an even-numbered route, in practice it is a north–south route for most of its length.

Route description
State Road 162 begins at SR 62 in Gentryville. Going east, it passes through Lincoln City near the Lincoln Boyhood National Memorial, then through Santa Claus (near Holiday World & Splashin' Safari), and then goes north through Ferdinand (near Interstate 64 exit 63). It terminates in Jasper where it re-joins U.S. Route 231.

History
The highway was designated the William A. Koch Memorial Highway in 2002 following the death of Bill Koch, who, along with his father, Louis J. Koch, was instrumental in creating the Holiday World & Splashin' Safari and the Lincoln Boyhood National Memorial. He was also the chief developer of the town of Santa Claus, Indiana, which has grown from less than 100 residents in 1960 to over 2,100 today.

Major intersections

References

External links

162
Transportation in Dubois County, Indiana
Transportation in Spencer County, Indiana